Luigi Bosco (20 March 1922 – 13 October 2006) was an Italian professional football player.

External links
 Luigi Bosco

1922 births
2006 deaths
Association football defenders
Catania S.S.D. players
Como 1907 players
Italian footballers
Juventus F.C. players
Serie A players
People from Montechiaro d'Asti
Footballers from Piedmont
Sportspeople from the Province of Asti